David Lee (born 24 March 1948) is a Canadian sports shooter. He competed at the 1984 Summer Olympics and the 1988 Summer Olympics.

References

External links
 

1948 births
Living people
Canadian male sport shooters
Olympic shooters of Canada
Shooters at the 1984 Summer Olympics
Shooters at the 1988 Summer Olympics
Sportspeople from Long Beach, California
Commonwealth Games medallists in shooting
Commonwealth Games silver medallists for Canada
Shooters at the 1990 Commonwealth Games
20th-century Canadian people
Medallists at the 1990 Commonwealth Games